Koreh Band (also Romanized as Korreh Band; also known as Karaband, Khowreh Band, and Kurreh Band) is a village in Angali Rural District of the Central District of Bushehr County, Bushehr province, Iran. At the 2006 census, its population was 1,277 in 257 households. The following census in 2011 counted 1,250 people in 322 households. The latest census in 2016 showed a population of 1,203 people in 340 households; it was the largest village in its rural district.

References 

Populated places in Bushehr County